A chapel is a small church or room for Christian worship or, for some denominations, the preferred term for a church.

Chapel may also refer to:

Places
 Chapel, Cornwall, England, a hamlet
 Chapel, Cumbria, England, a hamlet
 Chapel, Fife, Scotland
 Chapel Street, Melbourne, Australia, a shopping, dining and entertainment precinct
 Chapel, Howell County, Missouri, United States, an unincorporated community
 Chapel, Putnam County, Missouri, United States, an unincorporated community
 Chapel Brook, Franklin County, Massachusetts, United States
 Chapel Island (disambiguation)

Faith Chapel may refer to 
 Faith Chapel (Jekyll Island, Georgia)
 Faith Chapel Christian Center

Fictional characters
 Chapel (comics), in the Image Comics universe
  Billy Chapel, protagonist of the 1991 novel For Love of the Game, by Michael Shaara, and the 1999 film adaptation
 Christine Chapel, in the Star Trek universe
 Mr. Chapel, in the Vengeance Unlimited TV series

People
 Alain Chapel (1937-1990), French chef, credited as one of the originators of Nouvelle Cuisine
 Billy Chapel, bronze medalist in the 1966 U.S. Figure Skating Championships
 Charles Edward Chapel (died 1967), American politician and author of firearm and technical articles and books
 Jean Chapel, professional name of American country singer and songwriter Opal Jean Amburgey (1925-1995)

Other uses
 Chapel (music), a group of musicians
 Local union, a locally based trade union organisation which forms part of a larger, usually national, union
 Chapel Records, former name of Chapel Music, an American record label specializing in religious music
 Chapel (programming language), a parallel programming language developed by Cray Inc.
 Chapel Church, a Roman Catholic church in Brussels, Belgium
 Chapel inclined plane, an inclined plane (cable railway) in Derbyshire, England

See also

 Chapels (disambiguation)
 Chappell (disambiguation)
 Kapelle (disambiguation)